In computer science, a public interface is the logical point at which independent software entities interact. The entities may interact with each other within a single computer, across a network, or across a variety of other topologies.

It is important that public interfaces will be stable and designed to support future changes, enhancements, and deprecation in order for the interaction to continue.

Design

Guidance
A project must provide additional documents that describe plans and procedures that can be used to evaluate the project’s compliance.
architecture design document.
coding standards document.
software release plan document.
document with a plan for deprecating obsolete interfaces.
The programmer must create fully insulated classes and insulate the  public interfaces from compile-time dependencies.

Best practices
Present complete and coherent sets of concepts to the user.
Design interfaces to be statically typed. 
Minimize the interface’s dependencies on other interfaces. 
Express interfaces in terms of application-level types.
Use assertions only to aid development and integration.

Example

C++ interface 
Use protocol classes to define public interfaces.
The characteristics of a protocol class are:
It neither contains nor inherits from classes that contain member data, non-virtual functions, or private (or protected) members of any kind.
It has a non-inline virtual destructor defined with an empty implementation.
All member functions other than the destructor, including inherited functions, are declared pure virtual and left undefined.
Benefits
The benefits of using protocol classes include:
Insulating applications from the external client
Insulating changes that are internal to the interface
Insulating changes to the public interface from changes to the implementation of the interface
Insulation has costs, but these tend to be outweighed by the gains in interoperability and reusability.
Costs:
Going through the implementation pointer
Addition of one level of indirection per access
Addition of the size of the implementation pointer per object to memory requirements

Other information
Various methodologies, such as refactoring, support the determination of interfaces. Refactoring generally applies to the entire software implementation, but is especially helpful in properly flushing out interfaces.  There are other approaches defined through the pattern community.

References 

Software architecture